This is a list of members of the Northern Territory Legislative Council from 30 October 1965 to 26 October 1968.

The 1965 election was the genesis of a party system in the Northern Territory, with the majority of candidates being nominated by political parties, and where NT Labor faced a party team for the first time, with the new North Australia Party nominating five candidates, although the party dissolved shortly after this election.

An administrative change in 1965 saw the president of the council no longer being the Administrator of the Northern Territory, with the council electing its own president, Harry Chan, in December 1965.

 "Appointed (N)" indicates the councillor was a Non-official Member appointed by the Territory Administrator, but generally from a community or business background, not a government official or public servant.
 The independent member for Barkly, Len Purkiss, died from silicosis on 24 November 1965.  Eric Marks (Labor) was elected to replace him in a by-election on 5 February 1966.
 Labor member Peter Murray resigned as member for Arnhem in 1966. Ron Withnall, formerly an appointed Official Member, was elected to replace him in a by-election on 26 November 1966.

See also
1965 Northern Territory general election

References

Members of Northern Territory parliaments by term